There is a small but recognisable Russian community in India which comprises Indian citizens of Russian heritage as well with Russian expatriates and migrants residing in India. According to the Russian government, 845 Russian citizens are registered as living in India.

Russians in Goa

Immigrants

The state of Goa have received many Russian immigrants in the last few years. The Russian exodus to Goa has become a trend as many young people who are unhappy with life back home are moving there for good in search of inner peace.  Cheap daily charter flights are now carrying thousands of Russians to the Indian State of Goa famous for its beaches and laid-back mood. Many Russians have also set up businesses in Goa. Many beach side restaurants post their signboards in English and Russian to attract Russian-speaking customers.

The village of Morjim is dubbed "Little Russia" by locals because of the high number of Russians living there.

Tourists
Goa has always been the favourite haunt among Russian travelers to India. On average, an estimated 3,500 Russians would descend on Goa's shores every ten days in the tourism season.

Russians in Tamil Nadu
The Russian expatriate community in the state of Tamil Nadu is numbering 6,000 people composed mostly of scientists, engineers, artists, independent entrepreneurs and international students. There is a Russian Consulate, a Russian Science Center and a Russian Cultural Centre located in Chennai. Dr. M.G.R. Educational and Research Institute has a number of Russian medical students due to foreign exchange programmes with Stavropol State Medical Academy. There are about 40 Russian scientists working in the Koodankulam Nuclear Power Plant and many of them came with their families when they got transferred to Nagercoil. Today there are quite a few Russians learning Tamil and they often visit Tamil Nadu to attend seminars and lectures.

Other parts of India

Karnataka
Many Russian space scientists and experts work in the Indian Space Research Organisation (ISRO) in Bangalore assisting in the development the rover for Chandrayaan-2 and also in the Indian manned mission.

Kerala
Many Russian space scientists and experts work in the Vikram Sarabhai Space Centre (VSSC) in Thiruvananthapuram. There is a Russian Consulate in the city of Thiruvananthapuram.

Maharashtra
Mumbai currently has less than 100 Russians, most of them visiting businesswomen/men, engineers and technicians deputed to support Russian-built engineering in various parts of the city.

Ranchi
There is a community of Russians in SSFR Russian colony, Ranchi which is a consul enclaving part of Russian community from India. They are engaged in leather business, seller and electricians and engineers. Ranchi is hosting 3 percent of Russian tour guides and workers

See also
 India–Russia relations
 Indians in Russia
 Consulate-General of Russia in Mumbai

References

Europeans in India
India
 
India–Russia relations
Russian